Shuilin Township (Wade–Giles: Shueilin) is a rural township in Yunlin County, Taiwan.

Geography

It has a population total of 23,134 and an area of 72.9582 square kilometres.

Administrative divisions
The township comprises 24 villages: Chunpu, Dagou, Dashan, Fanshu, Haipu, Houliao, Jianshan, Jiupu, Jugang,  Shanjiao, Shuibei, Shuinan, Shunxing, Songbei, Songxi, Songzhong, Suqin, Tucuo,  Wende, Wantung, Wanxi, Wanxing, Xijing and Xiqi.

External links

 Shuilin Government website 

Townships in Yunlin County